The Metropolitan Cathedral of Saint Sebastian, better known as the Metropolitan Cathedral of Rio de Janeiro or as the Cathedral of St. Sebastian of Rio de Janeiro, is the seat of the Roman Catholic Archdiocese of São Sebastião do Rio de Janeiro. The cathedral is the See of the Metropolitan Archbishops of the city of Rio de Janeiro, Brazil.  The church is dedicated to Saint Sebastian, the patron saint of Rio de Janeiro.

Architecture

The cathedral was designed by Edgar de Oliveira da Fonseca in a modern style based on Mayan architectural style of pyramids. The current cathedral was built between 1964 and 1979 and replaced as seat of the Archdiocese a series of churches that had served as cathedrals since 1676, the most recent and notable of those being the Church of Our Lady of Mount Carmel of the Ancient See, now known as the Old Cathedral, built in the 18th century, and that had been declared Rio's cathedral in the early 19th century.

The New Cathedral, as it is sometimes called, is located in the center of the city. Inside, the area measures 8,000 square meters and sufficient 5,000 seats(it has a standing-room capacity of 20,000 people).

The cathedral's four rectilinear stained glass windows soar  from floor to ceiling.

See also

Old Cathedral of Rio de Janeiro

References

External links

 Official site

Roman Catholic churches in Rio de Janeiro (city)
Roman Catholic cathedrals in Rio de Janeiro (state)
Roman Catholic churches completed in 1979
Modernist architecture in Brazil
Cathedrals in Rio de Janeiro (city)
20th-century Roman Catholic church buildings in Brazil